David Melkumovich Malyan (17 April 1904 in Zakatala - 17 July 1976 in Yerevan) was a Soviet and Armenian film and stage actor.

Education and career

David Malyan studied at Armenian Drama studio in Tbilisi from 1922 to 23 and Worked in the theatres in Yerevan, Tbilisi, Leninakan. He was one of the leading actors of the Sundukyan Drama Theatre of Yerevan Since 1932 .

Awards 
 Honored Artist of the Armenian SSR (1936). 
People's Artist of the Armenian SSR (1943).
 People's Artist of the USSR (1974).

Filmography 
 1926 - Shor and Shorshor (as devil)
 1935 - Pepo (as Kakuli)    
 1937 - Six Shots (as officer)
 1938 - Sevan's Fishermen (as Aram)
 1938 - Zangezur (as Makich)
 1939 - Mountainous March (as Vardan)
 1941 - Blood for Blood (as commander of a tank), short
 1941 - Family of Patriots (as Levon), short
 1943 - David-Bek (as Shahumyan)
 1947 - Anahit (as Hrant)
 1955 - Ghosts Leave the Peaks (as Satunts)
 1955 - Looking of the Addressee (as Suren)
 1956 - The Heart Sings (as Markaryan)
 1957 - Personally Known (as Kon)
 1957 - To Whom the Life Smiles (as Metsaturyan)
 1958 - What's All the Noise of the River About? (as Darbinyan)
 1960 - They are to Live (as Petrosyan)
 1961 - Twelve Companions (as Minasyan)
 1964 - The Difficult Pass (Davtyan)
 1966 - Hunter From Lalvar (as senior hunter)

References

External links

Armenian male film actors
Armenian male stage actors
1904 births
1976 deaths
20th-century Armenian male actors
Soviet male actors